The 1968 New Mexico State Aggies football team was an American football team that represented New Mexico State University as an independent during the 1968 NCAA University Division football season.  In their first year under head coach Jim Wood, the Aggies compiled a 5–5 record and were outscored by a total of 244 to 228. The team played its home games at Memorial Stadium.

Schedule

References

New Mexico State
New Mexico State Aggies football seasons
New Mexico State Aggies football